Knollbury is a scheduled Iron Age hillfort enclosure to the north west of Chadlington in Oxfordshire. The two gaps in the earth banks at the eastern corners are believed to be of a later date.

References

External links
 Knollbury on the English Heritage's Record of Scheduled Monuments (pdf file)

Neolithic settlements
Buildings and structures in Oxfordshire
History of Oxfordshire